Harold Cecil Allwork (22 April 1909 – 31 October 1942) was an Australian rugby league footballer. He competed in the New South Wales Rugby League for North Sydney, and also represented the Second Australian Imperial Force in rugby league during the Second World War.

Early life and rugby career
Allwork was born on 22 April 1909 in Eastbourne, England to William Thomas and Edith Mary Allwork. Allwork appeared in 16 matches for North Sydney in 1933–34, gaining 2 tries and earning 6 points in 16 appearances.

Personal life and military career
Allwork was married and worked as a carpenter. He enlisted as a private in the Second Australian Imperial Force on 15 July 1940 and was assigned to the 2/3rd Pioneer Battalion. In 1940, Allwork appeared once for the AIF rugby league team. Allwork was transferred to the Middle Eastern theatre in November 1941, and was given 60 days field punishment for committing an "offence against the person of an invaded country" and for "striking a superior officer" in May 1942. He was killed in action during the Second Battle of El Alamein on 31 October 1942 and is buried at the El Alamein War Cemetery.

Career statistics

References

1909 births
1942 deaths
Australian Army personnel of World War II
Australian Army soldiers
Australian military personnel killed in World War II
English emigrants to Australia
English rugby league players
North Sydney Bears players
Rugby league forwards
Rugby league players from East Sussex
Sportspeople from Eastbourne